Maximilian Wagener (born 3 January 1995) is a German footballer who plays as a winger for Oberliga Niederrhein club VfB Hilden.

Club career
Wagener has been the captain of the Bayer Leverkusen Under-19 team.

He made his competitive debut for Bayer Leverkusen during the 2013–14 UEFA Champions League campaign against Paris Saint-Germain when he came on as a substitute on 12 March 2014.

On 1 September 2014, 3. Liga side VfL Osnabrück announced that they had loaned him from Bayer Leverkusen for the current season until summer 2015. The deal had been possible and quickly doable by the good relationship between the clubs.

References

External links
 

1995 births
People from Mettmann (district)
Sportspeople from Düsseldorf (region)
Footballers from North Rhine-Westphalia
Living people
German footballers
Association football wingers
Bayer 04 Leverkusen II players
Bayer 04 Leverkusen players
VfL Osnabrück players
SG Wattenscheid 09 players
SSVg Velbert players
3. Liga players
Regionalliga players
Oberliga (football) players